Michael "Mike" Anthony Riley (born 17 December 1964) is an English former professional football referee, who has refereed matches in the English Football League, Premier League, and for FIFA. Riley currently serves as the general manager of the Professional Game Match Officials Limited.

Career
Riley was born in Leeds in West Yorkshire.

He became a national Football League referee in 1994, having previously served five years on their assistant referees' list. He was later granted FIFA status in 1999 allowing him to officiate international fixtures.

In 2002, Riley refereed the English FA Cup Final between Arsenal and Chelsea, which he later stated was "the highlight of my career".

Riley took charge of the 2004 Football League Cup Final, between Bolton and Middlesbrough, in a game that saw all three goals scored within the first 25 minutes. He awarded a penalty to Middlesbrough after seven minutes and cautioned five players during the course of the game. Riley failed to spot penalty taker, Zenden, kicking the ball twice.

Riley also headed England's refereeing team alongside assistants Philip Sharp and Glenn Turner at the UEFA Euro 2004 finals.

Riley refereed the controversial 2004 match between Manchester United and Arsenal, also known as the Battle of the Buffet, with the result ending Arsenal's record-breaking 49 match unbeaten run.

Riley officiated the Football League Championship playoff final between West Ham United and Preston North End in 2005. West Ham ran out 1–0 victors, seeing them promoted to the FA Premier League.

Riley was invited to go to Hong Kong to take charge of the 2006–07 Hong Kong FA Cup final between South China and Happy Valley in 2007. South China won by 3–1, allowing them to achieve a treble in local competitions (First Division League, Senior Shield and FA Cup). Riley gave three penalty kicks in the match, two for South China and one for Happy Valley.

Mike Riley was appointed manager of the Professional Game Match Officials Board (PGMOB) in June 2009, replacing Keith Hackett. This effectively ended his career in refereeing matches.

In June 2022 it was announced that he would be stepping down as the English refereeing chief effective from the end of the 2022/23 season.

Career statistics

References

External links
Mike Riley Referee Statistics at soccerbase.com

English football referees
Living people
1964 births
Sportspeople from Leeds
Premier League referees
FA Cup Final referees
UEFA Euro 2004 referees